Alfredo Antonini (May 31, 1901 – November 3, 1983) was a leading Italian-American symphony conductor and composer who was active on the international concert stage as well as on the CBS radio and television networks from the 1930s through the early 1970s. In 1972 he received an Emmy Award for Outstanding Achievement in Religious Programming on television for his conducting of the premiere of Ezra Laderman's opera And David Wept for CBS television during 1971. In addition, he was awarded the Order of Merit of the Italian Republic in 1980

Biography 
Antonini was born in Alessandria and pursued his musical studies at the Royal Conservatory in Milan. He was a student of Italian conductor Arturo Toscanini. He distinguished himself as both an organist and pianist with La Scala Orchestra in Milan prior to emigrating to the United States in 1929. His musical talents were shared by his father who served as a member of the Buenos Aires Opera company at the Teatro Colón after leaving Italy for Argentina. In addition, his wife Sandra was a both a piano accompanist and voice teacher.<ref>[https://books.google.com/books?id=TGpQAAAAIBAJ&dq=Alfredo+Antonini&pg=PA54&article_id=4104,2912246 "Alfredo, Sandra Antonini to give concert as gift to communitySt. Petersburg Times, April 19, 1980 p. 54 on Google Books]</ref>

During the 1940s, he distinguished himself as a conductor of several leading orchestras while performing on CBS Radio. These included: the CBS Pan American Orchestra (1940–1949), as part of the cultural diplomacy initiative of the Department of State and the Office of the Coordinator of Inter-American Affairs during World War II, the Columbia Concert Orchestra (1940–1949) and the CBS Symphony Orchestra. During the 1940s Antonini also led the CBS Symphony  Orchestra in several recordings for the Voice of America broadcasting service.

His performances with the CBS Pan American Orchestra were noteworthy for helping to introduce Latin American music and the Mexican bolero to large audiences in the United States.

The 1940s: Radio

During the 1940s Antonini conducted live radio broadcasts of the program Viva America on the CBS Radio and La Cadena de las Americas (Network of the Americas) in collaboration with several international artists including: Nestor Mesta Chayres (aka "El Gitano De Mexico"), Terig Tucci, Juan Arvizu (aka "El Troubador de las Americas"), Elsa Miranda , Eva GarzaDeborah R. Vargas. 
Dissonant Divas in Chicana Music: The Limits of La Onda, University of Minnesota Press, Minneapolis, 2012, pp. 155-157;  and John Serry.Media Sound & Culture in Latin America & the Caribbean (eds Bronfman, Alejandra & Wood, Andrew Grant). University of Pittsburgh Press, Pittsburgh, PA, USA, 2012, p. 49 http://books.google.com See p. 49. Accessed 29 December 2022. He also appeared with Chayres and the New York Philharmonic in the Night of the Americas Concert series at Carnegie Hall., which, according to The New York Times, was eagerly anticipated by the general public.The New York Times, 4 May 1950, p. 37 Additional performances in collaboration with Arvizu and the CBS Tipica Orchestra for the Inter-America Music Fiesta at Carnegie Hall also attracted widespread acclaim.The New York Times, 1 February 1942, p. D2 

In 1946, Antonini recorded several popular Latin American songs on the album Latin American Music - Alfredo Antonini and Viva America Orchestra for Alpha Records (catalogue #'s 12205A, 12205B, 12206A, 12206B) including: Tres Palabras (Osvaldo Farres), Caminito de Tu Casa (Julio Alberto Hernández), Chapinita (Miguel Sandoval) and Noche De Ronda (Augustin Lara). Latin American Music catalog.loc.gov. Accessed 29 December 2022. Critical review of the albums in The New Records praised his conducting talents and hailed the collection as among the best new albums of Latin American music. Latin American Music - Alfredo Antonini and Viva America Orchestra critical review of the album in The New Records (pp. 6-7),  archive.org. Accessed 29 December 2022.

Later in the 1940s, Antonini collaborated with vocalist Victoria Cordova in a series of recordings for Muzak, featuring compositions familiar to audiences in both North and South America. Included among these were: What a Difference a Day Made - Maria Grever, You Belong to My Heart - Agustin Lara, Siboney - Ernesto Lecuona, Amor - Gabriel Ruiz, Say It Isn't So - Irving Berlin, How Deep is the Ocean - Irving Berlin and A Perfect Day - Carrie Jacobs-Bond."Victoria Cordova" and Alfredo Antonini Orcehatra sound recording for Muzak archived in the Library of Congress Online Catalog at catalog.loc.gov. Accessed 29 December 2022.Victoria Cordova and Alfredo Antonini Orchestra sound recording for Muzak #2, catalog.loc.gov. Accessed 29 December 2022. He also collaborated with the Latin group Los Panchos Trio in a recording of the Chilean cueca dance La Palma for Pilotone records (#P45-5067). In addition, he recorded several songs for Columbia records with operatic baritone Carlo Morelli which included "La spagnola" (#17192-D), Alma Mia (#17192-D) Canta Il Mare (#17263-D), Si Alguna Vez (#17263-D). Additional collaborators included: Nino Martini for a recording of the song Amapola (Columbia, #17202-D) and Nestor Chayres for a recording of Granada (Decca, #23770 A).

At the close of the decade in 1948, Antonini also appeared as the conductor in the premier program of the CBS Symphony Summer Series which was broadcast live over the CBS Radio network. During this time he also collaborated with leading orchestral musicians including Julius Baker.

The 1950s: Opera

During the 1950s, Antonini was a Professor of Music at St. John's University, located in Brooklyn, New York. He taught the Music Appreciation course. As a musical director for CBS Television during the 1950s, he was instrumental in presenting a program of classical and operatic music to the general public. His collaboration with Julie Andrews, Richard Rodgers, and Oscar Hammerstein II in a production of Cinderella for CBS television was telecast live in color on 31 March 1957 to an audience of 107 million.Amy Asch.The Completre Lyrics of Oscar Hammerstein II, Alfred A. Knopf, New York, 2008, p. 380  http://books.google.com  During this decade, he also appeared with several noted operatic sopranos including: Eileen Farrell and Beverly Sills. Later in 1957, he became the musical director/conductor of the Tampa Philharmonic Orchestra.

In 1951 he also served as both the orchestra leader and the Choral leader for the CBS Radio program Music Land U.S.A which featured talented vocalists. Included on the broadcast were Lois Hunt, Earl Wrightson and Thomas Hayward.  

Antonini served as a conductor of the open-air summer concerts held at the landmark Lewisohn Stadium in New York City during the 1940s, 1950s and 1960s. He appeared at least once during each season while featuring leading talent from the Metropolitan Opera.Seven Frequent Stadium Conductors - Alfredo Antonini and starts from the Met at Lewisohn Stadium, academicworks.cuny.edu. Accessed 29 December 2022. His appearances with the New York Philharmonic Symphony Orchestra and the Lewisohn Stadium Orchestra during the series of Italian Night concerts frequently attracted audiences which exceeded 13,000 guests. These performances featured arias from the standard Italian operatic repertoire and showcased such operatic luminaries as: Jan Peerce, Eileen Farrell, Richard Tucker, Beverly Sills, Licia Albanese, Eva Likova, Robert Weede, Cloe Elmo and Robert Merrill.The New York Times, 24 July 1950, pg. 26The New York Times, 18 July 1952, pg 10The New York Times, 10 July 1954, pg. 6The New York Times, 14 May 1958, pg. 36The New York Times, 6 May 1959, pg 48

1960s-1970s: Television
 
During the early 1960s, Antonini also conducted the CBS Orchestra on the educational public affairs program American Musical Theater which also featured Robert Weede and Laurel Hurley. Alfredo Antonini, CBS Orchestra and New York City Board of Education, books.google.com. Accessed 29 December 2022.
During this time, Antonini continued to collaborate as a guest conductor with instrumental soloists, including Benny Goodman in 1960 for a performance of Mozart's Clarinet Concerto at Lewisohn Stadium. In addition, he conducted the Symphony of the Air in the live prime-time television special Spring Festival of Music for CBS Television. This collaboration with the pianist John Browning and the producer Robert Herridge showcased a performance of a movement from Sergie Rachmaninoff's Second Piano Concerto. The performance was noted for its musical excellence as well as its dramatic visual presentation on television.
 
In 1962, Antonini collaborated with First Lady of the United States Jacqueline Kennedy, director Franklin J. Schaffner, and journalist Charles Collingwood of CBS News for the groundbreaking television documentary A Tour of the White House with Mrs. John F. Kennedy. The documentary television program was watched by more than 80 million viewers throughout the world and received wide critical acclaim.The Cambridge Companion to John F. Kennedy (ed. Andrew Hoberick). Cambridge University Press, New York. 2015, p. 54;  

In 1964, Antonini appeared as conductor of the CBS Symphony Orchestra in an acclaimed adaptation of Hector Berlioz's sacred oratorio L'enfance du Christ for CBS Television. His operatic soloists included: Sherrill Milnes, Giorgio Tozzi, Ara Berberian, and Charles Anthony as supported by the choral voices of the Camerata Singers. At this time, he collaborated as conductor for a televised episode of The CBS Repertoire Workshop, "Feliz Borinquen", which showcased the talents of such leading Puerto Rican-American performers as: Martina Arroyo and Raul Davila.

In addition to performing as a conductor on WOR radio in New York City during the 1940s, he appeared as a guest conductor for leading symphonic orchestras in Chicago, Milwaukee, Oslo, Norway and Chile during the 1950s. During this time he also founded the Tampa Philharmonic Orchestra in Tampa, Florida, which eventually merged into the Florida Gulf Coast Symphony. In the 1960s, Antonini also appeared as a guest conductor with the New York Philharmonic at Philharmonic Hall during a grand opera benefit concert which featured the artistry of Jan Peerce and Robert Merrill. Throughout the 1960s he continued to collaborate with such operatic luminaries as Jan Peerce, Robert Merrill,Franco Corelli, Nicolai Gedda, Giorgio Tozzi, Gabriella Tucci, and Dorothy Kirsten in a variety of gala concerts.The New York Times, 14 November 1965, p. 101 He also performed with Roberta Peters at the Lewisohn Stadium at City College. 

In 1971, Antonini served as musical director on the CBS Television premier of Ezra Laderman's opera And David Wept, earning an Emmy Award for Outstanding Achievement in Religious Programming (1972). He collaborated in this premier production with such operatic luminaries as Sherrill Milnes, Rosalind Elias, and Ara Berberian.Margaret Ross Griffel.
Operas in English, Scarecrow Press, UK2013 p. 19;  "'And David Wept' premiered on CBS Television in 1971 with Sherrill Milnes and Ara Berberian"], books.google.com. Accessed 29 December 2022. Several years later, in 1975, he joined forces once again with Berberian and mezzo-soprano Elaine Bonazzi for the CBS television movie, A Handful of Souls.Nina David. TV Season 1975-76, Oryx Press 1975 p. 83, A Handful of Souls], books.google.com. Accessed 29 December 2022.

Antonini's collaborations at CBS Television extended beyond the realm of opera to include prominent figures from several professions including: 
 Philanthropy - (John D. Rockefeller III)
 Government - (Jacqueline Kennedy Onassis) 
 Journalism - (Charles Collingwood) Walter Cronkite, Daniel Shorr) 
 Art - (Henry Moore, Kenneth Clark) 
 Dance - (Mary Hinkson) 
 Drama - (John Alexander, Julie Andrews, Ingrid Bergman, Betty Comden, Henry Fonda,  Jackie Gleason, Steven Hill, Ron Holgate, Celeste Holm, Richard Kiley, Howard Lindsay, Michael Redgrave) 
 Concert Stage - (Charles Anthony John Browning)

Death
Alfredo Antonini died at the age of 82 during heart surgery in Clearwater, Florida, in 1983. He was buried in Sylvan Abbey Memorial Park cemetery in Clearwater and was survived by his wife Sandra and a son.

Compositions

 The Great City Sarabande Sicilian Rhapsody Suite for Cello and Orchestra Preludes for Organ Suite for Strings The United States of America, Circa 1790 Mambo TropicalDiscography

 Cinderella, vocalist Julie Andrews, Columbia Masterworks (OL5190), 12 Inch LP, 1957?
 American Fantasy, SESAC Records, 33 RPM LP, 195?
 Atmosphere By Antonini - Alfredo Antonini and His Orchestra, Coral Records (LVA 9031), 33PRM LP, 1956
 Romantic Classics, SESAC Records, 33 RPM LP, 195?
 Aaron Copland/Hugo Weisgall/Alfredo Antonini - Twelve Poems of Emily Dickenson, Columbia Masterworks (ML 5106), 33 RPM LP, 1956
 Songs from Sunny Italy - Richard Tucker with Alfredo Antonini Conducting the Columbia Concert Orchestra, Columbia Masterworks (ML 2155), 33 RPM LP, 1950
 Alfredo Antonini and His Orchestra - Dances of Latin America, London Records (LPB.294), 33 RPM LP, 1950
 Alfredo Antonini & The Columbia Concert Orchestra, soloist Richard Tucker, Columbia Masterworks (A-1540), 45 RPM, 195?
 Nestor Chayres Singing Romantic Songs of Latin America, Alfredo Antonini conductor, Decca, 78 RPM, 1947
 Juan Arvizu, Troubador of the Americas, Alfredo Antonini conductor, Columbia Records (#36663), 1941 78 RPM, 1941
 Latin American Music - Alfredo Antonini and Viva America Orchestra, Alfredo Antonini conductor of the Viva America Orchestra, Elsa Miranda vocalist, Alpha Records (#12205) 78 RPM, 1946
 Richard Tucker: Just For You with Alfredo Antonini and the Columbia Symphony Orchestra, Columbia Masterworks (A-1619-1), 45 RPM,195? 
 Amapola (Joseph Lacalle), vocalist Nino Martini, Columbia (#17202-D) 78 RPM, 194?
 Bolero - No Me Lo Digas (Maria Grever), vocalist Nino Martini, Columbia (#17202-D), 194?

 Nestor Chayres & Alfredo Antonini, Decca (#23770), 78 RPM 
 Granada (Agustin Lara), vocalist Nestor Chayres, Decca (#23770), 78 RPM (1946)
 Noche de Ronda (Maria Teressa Lara), vocalist Nestor Chayres,  Decca (#23770), 78 RPM (1946)
 La Palma, Los Panchos Trio, Pilotone (#P45 5067), 78 RPM (194?)
 Rosa Negra, Alfredo Antonini Viva America Orchestra, Pilotone (#P45 5069), 78 RPM (194?) 
 Alfredo Antonini and The Viva America Orchestra - Chiqui, Chiqui, Cha/Caminito De Tu Casa, Bosworth Music (BA.251), 78 RPM, (194?)
 Music of the Americas, Pilotone Album, 78 RPM LP, 194?
 La spagnola (V. Di Chiara), vocalist Carlo Morelli, Columbia (#17192D) 78 RPM (194?)
 Alma Mia (Maria Grever), vocalist Carlo Morelli, Columbia (#17192D) 78 RPM (194?)
 Viva Sevilla! and Noche de Amor vocalist Juan Arvizu, Columbia (#36664) 78 RPM (194?)
 Mi Sarape and Que Paso? vocalist Juan Arvizu, Columbia (#36665) 78 RPM (194?)
 El Bigot de Tomas and De Donde? vocalist Juan Arvizu, Columbia (#36666) 78 RPM (194?)
 Canta Il Marie (Mazzola) and Si Alguna Vez (Ponce)  vocalist Carlo Morelli Columbia (#17263-D) 78 RPM
 Esta Noche Ha Pasado (Sabre Marrequin) vocalist Luis G. Roldan, Columbia (#6201-x) 78 RPM (194?)
 Tres Palabras (Osvaldo Farres) vocalist Luis G. Roldan, Columbia (#6201-x) 78 RPM (194?)

FilmographyA Handful of Souls - (TV Movie, Conductor, 1975)And David Wept - (TV Movie, music director, 1971)Gauguin in Tahiti: The Search for Paradise - (TV Documentary, Conductor, 1967)The Emperor's New Clothes - (TV Movie, Conductor, 1967)Nehru: Man of Two Worlds - (CBS-TV, Conductor, 1966)Where the Spies Are - (Film, Conductor, 1966)CBS Reports - (TV Documentary, Conductor, 1965)The Nisei: The Pride and the Shame (CBS NEWS Documentary, Conductor, 1965)Jack and the Beanstalk - (TV Movie, Conductor, 1965)Pinocchio- (TV Movie, Conductor, 1965)L'enfance du Christ - (TV Movie, Conductor, 1964)} CBS Repertoire Workshop - (TV Series, Conductor, 1964)The Twentieth Century - (TV Documentary, musical director, 1964)TV in the USA: A History of Icons Idols and Ideas - Volume I 1950s–1960s Vincent Lobrutto. Greenwood, Santa Barbara. 2018 p. 137–138  The Twentieith Century (1957-1970)  Alfredo Antonini composer and the CBS Orchestra on http://books.google.comArias and Arabesques - (TV Movie, Conductor, 1962) Cabeza de Vaca - (TV Movie, Conductor, 1962)Biblion: the Bulletin of the New York Public Library The New York Public Library, New York 1992 p. 129 Cabeza de Vaca premiered by Alfredo Antonini on the CBS network in 1962 on http://books.google.comA Tour of the White House - (TV Documentary, musical director, 1962)An Act of Faith - (TV Movie, musical director, 1961)Twenty-Four Hours in a Woman's Life - (TV Movie, Conductor, 1961)And On Earth, Peace - (TV Movie, Composer, 1961)Spring Festival of Music: American Soloists - (TV Movie, Self, 1960)The Right Man - (TV Movie, Conductor, 1960)The Fabulous Fifties - (TV Documentary, musical director, 1960)The Movies Learn to Talk - (CBS NEWS documentary, Conductor, 1960)  The American Musical theater (CBS-TV, Conductor,1959)The Incredible Turk- (TV Documentary, Conductor, 1958)The Seven Lively Arts - (TV Series, musical director, 1957)Air Power - (TV Documentary, musical director, 1956-1957)The Decade that Shaped Television News - CBS in the 1950s Sig Mickelson. Praeger, Conn., 1998 p. 138-139  Walter Cronkite, Airpower and Alfredo Antonini conductor of the CBS Orchestra on http://books.google.comCinderella - (TV Special, music director, 1957)Studio One: Circle of Guilt - (CBS-TV, Conductor, 1956)Studio One: Dino - (CBS-TV, music director, 1956) Studio One: Star-Spangled Soldier - (CBS-TV, Music, 1956) Studio One in Hollywood - (TV Series, music director, 1954)Studio One: Dark Possession - (CBS-TV, Musical consultant, 1954)Studio One: Let me Go, Lover - (CBS-TV, music director, 1954)Studio One: Dry Run - (CBS-TV, Music, 1953) The Jane Froman Show - (TV Series, Conductor, 1952) The Cabinet of Dr. Caligari'' - (TV Movie, Composer, 1920)

Awards
 Primetime Emmy Award for Outstanding Achievement in Religious Programming (1972)
 Award for Distinguished Service to Music from the National Association for American Composers and Conductors
 Title of Commendatore awarded by the President of Italy (1977)
 Order of Merit of the Italian Republic (1980)

Archived works
 Selected scores of compositions by Alfredo Antonini broadcast on the CBS television network are archived within the CBS Collection of Manuscript Scores 1890–1972 at the New York Public Library for the Performing Arts at Lincoln Center in New York City, New York. 

 Selected sound recordings featuring Alfredo Antonini conducting the CBS Symphony Orchestra for Voice of America are archived at the New York Public Library for the Performing Arts at Lincoln Center in New York City, New York.

Professional affiliations

 American Society of Composers, Authors and Publishers ASCAP (1948)

References

External links
Alfredo Antonini on archive.org
Alfredo Antonini recordings archived in The Strachwitz Frontera Collection of Mexican and Mexican American Recordings at the University of California Los Angeles on frontera.library.ucla.edu
Alfredo Antonini at The Juilliard School of Music Libraries
 
Alfredo Antonini on Worldcat.org
Photograph of Alfredo Antonini on the" Viva America" radio program at CBS (March 8, 1946) on Getty Images

1901 births
1983 deaths
American male composers
American male conductors (music)
Emmy Award winners
Italian composers
Italian male composers
Italian conductors (music)
Italian male conductors (music)
20th-century American conductors (music)
20th-century American composers
20th-century Italian musicians
20th-century American male musicians
Italian emigrants to the United States